The Arabat Spit or Arabat Arrow is a barrier spit that separates the large, shallow and very salty Syvash lagoons from the Sea of Azov. The spit runs between the Henichesk Strait in the north and the north-eastern shores of Crimea in the south.

Name
It has been called an "arrow" since at least the middle of the 19th century.

The Arabat part of the name comes from the Arabat Fortress, a 17th-century Turkish fort at the southern end of the spit. "Arabat" derives from either Arabic "rabat" meaning a "military post" or Arabic "rabad" meaning a "suburb".

Geography and geology
The spit is low and straight on the Azov Sea side, whereas its Sivash side is more convoluted.

The top layers of other parts of the spit are formed by sand and shells washed by the flows of the Azov Sea. Its vegetation mostly consists of various weed grasses, thorn, festuce grasses, spear grass, crambe, salsola, salicornia, Carex colchica, tamarisk, rose hip, liquorice, etc. 

The spit is very young and was created by sedimentation processes around 1100–1200 AD.

History
The Arabat Arrow was wild until 1835 when a road and five stations at  intervals were built along it for postal delivery. Later in the 19th century, 25 rural and 3 military settlements and one village named Arabat appeared on the spit. The rural population amounted to some 235 people whose occupation was mostly fishing, farming, and salt production. The latter activity is traditional for the region due to the vast areas of shallow and very saline water in the Sivash lagoons.

Nowadays, the spit is a health resort and its Azov Sea side is used as a beach.

While the spit is geophysically part of the Crimean Peninsula, politically its northern half belongs to Kherson Oblast, Ukraine, while its southern portion is, de facto since 2014, a part of the Russian Republic of Crimea. The entirety of the spit was occupied during the annexation, although Russia withdrew its forces from the northern Kherson side in December 2014. The entire spit has been back under Russian control since 25 February 2022, following the Russian invasion of Ukraine.

On 5 January, Vladimir Saldo, head of the Russian occupation authorities in Kherson Oblast, stated that a new city would be planned on the split.  He urged preferential mortgages be offered to attract residents from the Russian Federation.

Populated places
The rural communities of Henicheska Hirka, Shchaslyvtseve and Strilkove are located in the northern section of the spit, within the Kherson Oblast. The community of Solyane is located in the southern part of the spit, administered as part of the Republic of Crimea.

Tourism 
Arabat Spit is a popular place for summer vacation among Ukrainians because of the warm water of the Sea of Azov. There are a variety of hotels and guesthouses on the first line of the sea. Arabat Spit is popular among kitesurfers and windsurfers.

See also
Spits of Azov Sea
Bay of Arabat
Barrier island

Notes

References

Bibliography

Shutov, Yu. "Арабатская стрелка" (in Russian) Tavria, 1983

External links

Detailed map of the Arabat Spit

Spits of Crimea
Spits of the sea of Azov
Russia–Ukraine border
Divided regions